Valentine Theodore Schaaf OFM (March 18, 1883-December 1, 1946) was a Catholic priest from Ohio, USA. In the 1920s he wrote The Cloister. He became Dean of the school of canon law at The Catholic University of America and, from 1945 to 1946, a General Minister of the Friars Minor (OFM). A scholarship fund is named for him.

References

External links 
Site dedicated to Fr. Valentine T. Schaaf

Ministers General of the Order of Friars Minor
American Friars Minor
Catholic University of America School of Canon Law faculty
Canon law jurists
1883 births
1946 deaths
20th-century American Roman Catholic priests